The World Forum for Proximity of Islamic Schools of Thought (WFPIST) as well as Tehran's Ecumenical Society is a forum that was established on October 1990 by order of Ayatollah Seyed Ali Khamenei in Tehran for the reconciliation between different Islamic schools and branches.

Background of the establishment

According to upper, many Islamic Scholars in the different schools tried to achieve proximity and finally unity. In the first step, the Iranian scholar, Sheikh Mohamad Taqi Qomi, emigrated to Egypt in the mid-twentieth century. He established a forum in Cairo that was named jam'iyyat al-tagrib bayn al-madhahib al-islamiyyain 1948. A number of scholars of Al-Azhar and some Egyptian politicians supported this forum and its secretary general Sheikh Qomi.This forum became the important center of proximate activities. The second step to achieve proximity between different schools of Islam was publication of Risalat al-Islam Magazine by jam'iyyat al-tagrib bayn al-madhahib al-islamiyya in Cairo. After these success experiences for achievement proximity, third step to achieve to proximity was the establishment of The World Forum for Proximity of Islamic Schools of Thought in order by Ayatollah Khamenei in 1990 in Tehran.

Schools recognized by the Forum
This world forum recognizes these Islamic Sects: The Hanafi, Shafi'i, Maliki and Hanbali from Sunnis Sects, Twelver and Zaidiyyah from Shias Sects. Also, this forum recognizes Ibadi.

Activities of the Forum

Conferences

The annual international conference is held every year in Islamic Unity Week. So far, twenty-five Islamic Unity conferences are held by forum. The last annual conference was held on January 7 to 10 2015. Sixty nine countries attend in this conference.
Except annual conferences, many conferences are held by forum for specific ceremonies. For example Holding the commemoration for Ayatollah Muhammad Baqir al-Sadr in April 2015.

Publications

Books
Many books are published by publication of forum in three subjects:
 Charters of Conferences of Islamic unity;
 Writings of the Center for Scientific Research of Forum;
 Approved books in Book Council.

Journals
 Risalat al-Taqrib: This magazine is published every two months in Arabic;
 Thought of Proximity: This journal is published quarterly in Persian;
 Courier of Proximity: This indoor journal is published monthly about forum's news;
 Risalat al-Islam: After stop publishing of Risalat al-Islam in Cairo, for importance of that, the forum in association with Astan Quds Razavi republished that magazine;
 Islam from the West viewpoint: This journal is published for introduction and review and critique of latest English books by topic anti-Islam unity.

Goals
According to the forum statute: 
 Trying to reclamation and extension to Islamic culture and defending the Quran and Sunnah;
 Trying to familiarity and more understanding between scholars, elites and leaders of the Islamic societies in the beliefs and Fiqh specially in  the fields of in the cultural and political;
 Extension to proximity opinions in the Islamic world to informing Muslims of efforts of Enemies of Islam for creating divisions between followers of Islamic schools;
 Solving pessimism and arguments between  Muslims from the different sects; 
 Trying to reinforcement and expanding of Ijtihad and inference in Islam;
 Trying to attune and establish a joint front to against the propaganda plots and cultural onslaught of enemies of Islam.

Structure
This forum have hierarchical structure:

General Assembly
The members of General Assembly are chosen among scholars, thinkers and Islamic religious leaders around the world for six year by the Supreme Council. The assembly is held every two years.

Supreme Council
According to the statute, The members of Supreme Council are chosen by Vali-e-Faqih for six years.

President
According to the statute, president is chosen by the majority of members of forum for two years. The first president of forum was Ayatollah Mohammad Baqir al-Hakim. Ayatollah Mohammad-Ali Taskhiri is the forum president now.

General Secretary
According to the statute, General Secretary has the highest executive status in the forum. Vali-e-Faqih elects General Secretary among the candidates who are nominated  by Supreme Council, for four years. The Secretary General is a member of the Supreme Council. The first General Secretary was Ayatollah Taskhiri. Already Ayatollah Mohsen Araki is the General Secretary of forum.

See also
 Al-Azhar Shia Fatwa
 World Assembly of Islamic Awakening

References

External links
 Islamic mazaheb university

Islam and politics
Contemporary Islamic philosophy
Shia–Sunni relations
International Islamic organizations
Islamic organizations established in 1990
20th-century philosophy